Haplocyonoides is an extinct genus of terrestrial carnivores belonging to the suborder Caniformia, family Amphicyonidae ("bear dog"), and which inhabited Europe from the Early Miocene subepoch (20 Mya)—(16.9 Mya).

Haplocyonoides was named by Hürzeler (1940) and was assigned to Amphicyonidae by Carroll (1988).

Fossil distribution
One site in Les Beilleaux, France.

Sources

Cenozoic mammals of Europe
Bear dogs
Miocene carnivorans
Prehistoric carnivoran genera